Crossings Christian School is a private Christian school that serves approximately 1100 students in the greater Oklahoma City, Oklahoma area.

There are four divisions within the school: Crossings Upper School, Crossings Middle School, Crossings Lower School, and Crossings Early Childhood.

History

Crossings Christian School was founded in 2000 as a ministry of Crossings Community Church, with 39 preschool students. Today, the school has grown to one of the largest private schools in the Oklahoma City metro with over 1,115 students in preschool through twelfth grade.

CCS is accredited through the Association of Christian Schools International, ACSI, and reciprocally accredited through the state of Oklahoma. As a college preparatory school, CCS offers rigorous academics proven by the Class of 2019’s average ACT score of 27.4. CCS also landed a top ten spot in the state of Oklahoma for the highest ACT scores in 2018.

The graduating class of 2019 included 56 graduates with an average:
3.84 GPA
27.4 GPA
$85,000 average scholarship per student- totaling over $4.85 million in scholarship offers

Since graduating their first student in 2012, Crossings Christian School graduates have included:
1 Presidential Scholar
1 Questbridge Scholar
3 National Merit Finalists
4 National Merit Commended
52 AP Scholars
14 AP Scholars with Distinction
20 AP Scholars with Honor
2 National AP Scholars
88 Oklahoma Academic Scholars
 
Alongside  strong academics, CCS students participate in a multitude of extra and co-curricular activities including:
13 OSSAA sanctioned athletic opportunities
Full array of fine arts programs including art, vocals, band, jazz band, orchestra, & debate
Student clubs and organizations
19 AP courses offered on campus
Concurrent enrollment options
Variety of service opportunities
Spiritual Formation through weekly chapel, daily Bible studies, and small group opportunities.

The CCS Campus covers more than 200,000 square feet campus-wide including its first building, built in 2006 that houses lower school students ages kindergarten through fourth. The additional early childhood wing and PE gymnasium were added in 2009. Fifth through eighth grade students moved into the middle school building, completed December 2014. The freshmen through senior classes have enjoyed the upper school facility since 2010 and the new commons, gymnasium, and performing arts facility since the spring of 2017. 
 
Additionally, the CCS Athletic Complex was completed in 2014 and covers eleven acres onsite and includes a football stadium, track and field, soccer, baseball, and softball facilities as well as a 10,000 square foot field house with locker, equipment, weight, and training rooms. CCS recently began progress on a new 7 acre sports complex directly north of the upper school. These new facilities will include an 8 tennis court complex and soccer practice and game field. A 7,500 square foot recreation building will bridge the two complexes and is designed for large and small group activities as well as home tennis and soccer locker rooms.    
 
Crossings Christian School resides on the campus of Crossings Community Church. A separate 501(c)3, CCS is financially and administratively separate from the church

Construction
In 2005, Crossings Lower School opened at 14400 N. Portland Ave., their current location.
In 2007, Crossings Lower School added eight classrooms to the lower school.
In 2010, Crossings Upper School opened across from the lower school, and a gymnasium and event lobby were added to the lower school.
By the start of the second semester in the 2014–15 school year, all middle school faculty and students were moved from the upper school to the newly built middle school to accommodate its growing size.

Basketball Season 2020-2021
The Crossings Basketball team for 2020-2021 consisted of: Cooper Gudell, Miles Brown, Drew Middindorf, Brody Gibbs, Drew Wood, Reid Lovelace, Jackson Ledlow, Sam Taylor, Matthew Hooper, Jonah Kelly, Evan Crotts, Luke Olson, Luke Brown, Mack Gudell. With head coach being Shawn Schenk, and assistant coaches, Dillion Coplin and Brandon Parker. Managed by Zak Sala, Cooper Mulunax, Rob Manchester, and Will Maschmeier. The team ended their phenomenal season with a 26-2 record. Losing only to Heritage Hall and CHA. They went on to win the schools first regionals, area and state championships. Along with two players, Reid and Cooper hitting a career 1000 points during the season. In addition the state finals game was also Coach Schenk’s 300th win. They beat the Beggs Demons in the state final, 51-49.

References

https://www.crossingsschool.org/athletics/basketball/boys-varsity/

http://www.ossaarankings.com/default.aspx?sel=ssch&sc=228&t=101898

External links
School District

Christian schools in Oklahoma
Education in Oklahoma City
Education in Oklahoma County, Oklahoma
Private K-12 schools in the United States
Private elementary schools in Oklahoma
Private middle schools in Oklahoma
Private high schools in Oklahoma